National Weather Digest was a scientific journal published quarterly by the National Weather Association and is devoted to peer-reviewed articles, technical notes, correspondence, and official news of the Association. National Weather Digest along with Electronic Journal of Operational Meteorology were merged into Journal of Operational Meteorology in 2013.

See also 
 List of scientific journals
 List of scientific journals in earth and atmospheric sciences

External links 
 NWA journal homepage

Meteorology journals
Publications established in 1976
Quarterly journals